The 2019–20 Oakland Golden Grizzlies men's basketball team represented Oakland University in the 2019–20 NCAA Division I men's basketball season. The Golden Grizzlies, led by 36th-year head coach Greg Kampe, played their home games at the Athletics Center O'rena in Auburn Hills, Michigan as members of the Horizon League. They finished the season 14–19, 8–10 in Horizon League play to finish in sixth place. They defeated Cleveland State in the first round of the Horizon League tournament before losing in the quarterfinals to Green Bay.

Previous season
The Golden Grizzlies finished the 2018–19 season 16–17 overall, 11–7 in Horizon League play, where they finished in third place. In the Horizon League tournament, they defeated Youngstown State in the quarterfinals, before falling to Northern Kentucky in the semifinals.

Roster

Schedule and results

|-
!colspan=12 style=| Exhibition

|-
!colspan=12 style=| Non-conference regular season

|-
!colspan=9 style=| Horizon League regular season

|-
!colspan=12 style=| Horizon League tournament
|-

|-

Source

References

Oakland Golden Grizzlies men's basketball seasons
Oakland Golden Grizzlies
Oakland Golden Grizzlies men's basketball
Oakland Golden Grizzlies men's basketball